Lionel George Curtis CH (1872–1955) was a British official and author. He advocated British Empire Federalism and, late in life, a world state. His ideas concerning dyarchy were important in the development of the Government of India Act 1919 and more generally, his writings influenced the evolution of the Commonwealth of Nations.

Life
Curtis was born at Coddington, Herefordshire in 1872, the youngest of the four children of George James Curtis, Anglican rector of the parish, and his wife Frances Carr, daughter of the Rev. John Edmund Carr. He was educated at Haileybury College and then at New College, Oxford, where he read law. He fought in the Second Boer War with the City Imperial Volunteers and served as secretary to Lord Milner (a position that had also been held by adventure-novelist John Buchan), during which time he dedicated himself to working for a united self-governing South Africa. Following Milner's death in 1925, he became the second leader of Milner's Kindergarten until his own death in 1955. His experience led him to conceptualize his version of a Federal World Government, which became his life work. In pursuit of this goal, he founded (1910) the quarterly Round Table.  He was appointed (1912) Beit lecturer in colonial history at the University of Oxford, and a Fellow of All Souls College.

In 1919 Curtis led a delegation of British and American experts to organize the Royal Institute of International Affairs during the Peace Conference of Paris.

In 1947, Curtis was nominated for the Nobel Peace Prize; in 1949, he was appointed a Companion of Honour, on the thirtieth anniversary of the founding of Chatham House.

Works
Curtis' most important works were:
 The Problem of the Commonwealth (London: Macmillan, 1915);
 The Commonwealth of Nations (1916);
 Dyarchy (1920); and,
 Civitas Dei: The Commonwealth of God (1938), arguing that the United States must rejoin the British commonwealth and that the Commonwealth must evolve into a world government.

Notes

References
 World Revolution In The Cause of Peace, Basil Blackwell, Oxford (1949)
 From Empire to International Commonwealth: A Biography of Lionel Curtis by Deborah Lavin, Oxford University Press (1995), 
 The Round Table movement and imperial union by John Edward Kendle,   University of Toronto Press (1975), 
 The Anglo-American Establishment by Professor Carroll Quigley

External links

 Curtis, Lionel Round Table Movement - Past and Future, 1913
Papers relating to the application of the principle of DYARCHY TO THE GOVERNMENT OF- INDIA, 1920

Catalogue of the papers of Lionel Curtis held at the Bodleian Library, Oxford

1872 births
1955 deaths
People from Herefordshire
British Army personnel of the Second Boer War
British male journalists
Editors of the Round Table Journal
Members of the Inner Temple
People educated at Haileybury and Imperial Service College
Fellows of All Souls College, Oxford
Alumni of New College, Oxford
City Imperial Volunteers officers
Members of the Order of the Companions of Honour
Chatham House people
Transvaal Colony people